Tomas Kaiser (born 2 December 1956) is a Swedish former racing driver from Saelen.

Kaiser began his career racing Formula Fords. In 1979 he raced in the European Formula Three Championship and British Formula Three Championship. In 1980 he finished fourth in the Swedish Formula Three Championship and competed in 1 race each in the British, European, and German F3 series. In 1981 he finished third in Swedish F3 and maintained a similar part-time schedule in the other series. In 1982 he made two starts in the European Formula Two Championship. In 1983 he drove in 8 of the 12 European F2 races but was only running at the finish in two of them. In 1984 he competed in 9 European F2 races and finished 11th in points, finishing in the points in fourth in the season finale at Brands Hatch. In 1985 European F2 gave way to International Formula 3000 and Kaiser competed in 7 races and finished 4th at Thruxton Circuit, good enough for 14th in points. In 1986 he competed in all 11 races for BS Automotive and finished 14th in points with a best finish of 4th at Pergusa. 1987 was his last season of professional racing as he competed in a full season of F3000 but failed to qualify for three races and didn't finish in the points in any races.

Alongside his driving career, Kaiser created Hello Sweden, a support and development program for emergent Swedish racing drivers. Prominent drivers such as Thomas Danielsson, Kenny Bräck, Björn Wirdheim and Sebastian Hohenthal were some of the recipients of this support.

In 1986 and early 1987, Kaiser had negotiations with Brabham and Arrows to become a Formula 1 driver in the 1987 season. He was very close to signing for Brabham to race alongside Riccardo Patrese but he was denied a Superlicence.

Kaiser was mentored by James Hunt throughout his Formula 3000 career.

As of 2022, Kaiser still acts as a tutor, manager and consultant for young racing drivers.

Racing record

Complete European Formula Two Championship results
(key) (Races in bold indicate pole position; races in italics indicate fastest lap)

Complete International Formula 3000 results
(key) (Races in bold indicate pole position; races in italics indicate fastest lap.)

References

1956 births
Swedish racing drivers
FIA European Formula 3 Championship drivers
British Formula Three Championship drivers
Swedish Formula Three Championship drivers
German Formula Three Championship drivers
European Formula Two Championship drivers
International Formula 3000 drivers
People from Malung-Sälen Municipality
Living people
Sportspeople from Dalarna County